The 2017–18 Wagner Seahawks men's basketball team represented Wagner College during the 2017–18 NCAA Division I men's basketball season. The Seahawks were led by sixth-year head coach Bashir Mason. They played their home games at Spiro Sports Center on the school's Staten Island campus as members of the Northeast Conference. The Seahwawks finished the season 23–10, 14–4 in NEC play to win the NEC regular season championship. In the NEC tournament, they defeated Central Connecticut and Robert Morris before losing to LIU Brooklyn in the championship game. As a regular season conference champion who did not win their conference tournament, they received an invitation to the National Invitation Tournament where they lost in the first round to Baylor.

Previous season 
The Seahawks finished the 2016–17 season 16–14 overall and 11–7 in NEC play to finish in a tie for third place. In the NEC tournament, they beat Fairleigh Dickinson before losing to Saint Francis (PA) in the semifinals.

Preseason 
In a poll of league coaches at the NEC media day, the Seahawks were picked to finish in third place.

Roster

Schedule and results

|-
!colspan=9 style=| Non-conference regular season

  
|-
!colspan=9 style=| NEC regular season  

    

|-
!colspan=9 style=| NEC tournament

|-
!colspan=9 style=| NIT

References 

Wagner Seahawks men's basketball seasons
Wagner
Wagner
Wagner
Wagner